Angelo Konstantinou (born 8 November 1978) is an Australian futsal goalkeeper who plays for Canberra Olympic in regulation 11 a side soccer as well as representing Australia with the Australia national futsal team. Unusually for a goalkeeper he is often Canberra Olympic's first choice penalty taker.

Konstantinou captained Canberra Olympic to the semi finals of the 2016 FFA Cup, scoring two penalties along the way.

References

External links
FIFA profile

1978 births
Living people
Futsal goalkeepers
Australian men's futsal players
National Premier Leagues players
Association football goalkeepers
Association football players not categorized by nationality